Westminster Academy is a private Christian school in Fort Lauderdale, Florida, serving students in grades PK2 through 12. It is an educational ministry of the Coral Ridge Presbyterian Church and is related denominationally to the Presbyterian Church in America. 
The main campus is located at 5601 North Federal Highway in Fort Lauderdale, with a "west campus" Athletic Complex located at 3701 NW 44th Street in Lauderdale Lakes.

During the 2017–18 academic year, the school has a total enrollment of 865 students: 326 in lower school (preprimary–5th grade), 224 in middle school (grades 6–8), and 315 in high school (grades 9–12). The current headmaster is  Joel Satterly.

Athletics 
Westminster Academy has won many state championships in various sports. Selected highlights include:
 State championship in football in 1990
 Boys' state basketball championship in 2002 featuring future University of Florida point guard Taurean Green, who attended Westminster Academy for one year
 Boys' state basketball championship in 2017, 2018, and 2019.
 Boys' state track championship in 2008, 2014, 2015, and 2017
 Boys' state track championship in 1979 (the school's first boys state championship team)
 Boys' state baseball in 1999 and 2000
 Boys' Cross Country state championships: 1983, 1984, 1985, 1987, 1988, and 2016. Head Coach Ken Key was coach for the 1983 and 2016 state titles. 
 Boys' basketball has received national recognition including a top 25 national ranking by maxpreps in the 2016–17 season.

Awards and recognition 

On Tuesday, September 30, 2014, the U.S. Secretary of Education, Arne Duncan, recognized the Westminster Academy Lower School as a 2014 National Blue Ribbon School in the category of Exemplary High Performing Schools. The Westminster Academy Lower School will be honored alongside 287 public and 50 private schools across the nation at a recognition ceremony held November 10–11, 2014, in Washington, D.C. In its 32-year history, the National Blue Ribbon Schools Program has bestowed this coveted award on just under 7,900 of America's schools.

The National Blue Ribbon Schools Program honors public and private elementary, middle, and high schools where students either achieve very high learning standards or are making notable improvements in closing the achievement gap. The award affirms the hard work of students, educators, families, and communities in creating safe and welcoming schools where students master challenging content.

History 
The school was founded in 1971 by the late Dr. D. James Kennedy, the founding pastor of the Coral Ridge Presbyterian Church.

In October 2000, Westminster Academy announced that it received an $8.35 million donation from 1978 graduate Jean Case and her husband Steve Case, the former chairman of America Online.

Notable alumni 
 Guma Aguiar, Class of 1995
 Kevin Chapman, Class of 2006, former professional baseball player
 Matt den Dekker, Class of 2006, coach in the New York Mets organization, former professional baseball player
 Rob Hoskins, Class of 1983, president of OneHope, an international Christian ministry
 Danny Kanell, Class of 1992, NFL Quarterback
 Jason Kennedy, Class of 2000, TV personality
 Michael Taylor, Class of 2009, Kansas City Royals baseball outfielder
 Elih Villanueva, Class of 2004, professional baseball pitcher for the West Virginia Power of the Atlantic League of Professional Baseball

Notable students who did not graduate 
 Mark Sanford, 115th Governor of South Carolina (2003 - 2011), U.S. Representative for South Carolina's 1st congressional district (1995 - 2001, 2013 - 2019)

References

External links 
 

Private elementary schools in Florida
High schools in Fort Lauderdale, Florida
Private middle schools in Florida
Presbyterian schools in the United States
Private high schools in Florida
Christian schools in Florida
Educational institutions established in 1971
1971 establishments in Florida